Mark Lopez or Marc Lopez could refer to: 

Mark López, American Olympic taekwando practitioner
Mark López (American executive), digital media executive
Mark Lopez (Filipino executive) (born 1972), chairman of ABS-CBN Corporation
Mark Hugo Lopez (born 1967), American economist
Marc López (born 1982), Spanish tennis player

See also
Marco Lopez (disambiguation)